The Slovenian Athletes Hall of Fame (slovene: "Hram slavnih slovenskih športnikov") was founded in 2011 by the Society of Slovenian Sports Journalists (Društvo športnih novinarjev Slovenije) and includes best Slovenian athletes of all time from different sport disciplines. This hall will be in function in 2012. At Slovenian Sportsperson of the Year event in December 2011 they inducted the first two Slovenian athletes, Leon Štukelj and Miro Cerar.

For more than a year and half, the Society of Slovenian Sports Journalists was preparing for the foundation of the "Slovenian Athletes Hall of Fame". They did this with one goal, to keep Slovenian athletes with great international results alive in our minds. They want to keep all sports equipment connected with this great athletes and save historic sport events from articles of already retired sports journalists and all others.

With this Hall of Fame of Slovenian athletes, the Society wants to invites visitors, students and all fans of sport, to keep Slovenian sport history alive, to allow best conditions for working of All Slovenian Sports Museum.

On 19 December 2012 twenty new inductees were introduced, also the Hall of fame was opened in Stožice Arena. On 28 November class of 2013 was introduced with 28 new athletes. Three athletes were introduced in August 2015, two in August 2016 and December 2017 and three in January 2019.

Inductees

See also
Slovenian Sportsperson of the Year

References

All-sports halls of fame
Athletes Hall of Fame
2011 establishments in Slovenia
Awards established in 2011
Halls of fame in Slovenia